Michael Lucky (born 1 January 1991) is a Nigerian footballer who plays as a forward for I-league club Chennai City FC.

Career
Lucky was signed by I-League club Chennai City FC in 2017. He made his first appearance for the club against Indian Arrows in a 3–0 loss.

References

1991 births
Living people
Nigerian footballers
Nigerian expatriate footballers
Expatriate footballers in India
Chennai City FC players
Association football forwards